The Great Bookie robbery was a crime committed in Melbourne, Australia, on 21 April 1976.

Crime
A well-organised gang of six stole what is widely believed to be from $14–16 million (in 2011 the equivalent of $88 million) from bookmakers in the Victoria Club, which was located on the second floor of a building in Queen Street, Melbourne. The true figure for the amount stolen has never been confirmed, as the Victoria Club quoted the missing figure to police as only $1 million to avoid the attention of the Australian Taxation Office (ATO). The gang included Raymond "Chuck" Bennett, who is believed to have been the mastermind, Ian Carroll, Laurence Prendergast and Norman Lee. They rented an office several floors above and hid the money in that room's safe before coolly walking out of the building and onto the street days after the event.

Aftermath

The identity of the robbers was widely known in the underworld and so Bennett became the target of standover men, who included Brian and Leslie Kane, and corrupt police demanding part of the proceeds. The Kane brothers were particularly violent psychopaths who wanted 'their cut' and were willing to torture, mutilate and kill to get their own way. After being told that the Kanes intended to kill him, Bennett, Prendergast and Vincent Mikkleson killed Leslie Kane on 19 October 1978 and went into hiding. The three were later arrested for the murder but as the body was never found, the charges were dismissed. With Brian Kane threatening to kill him, Bennett was arrested on a minor charge in 1979. While being escorted by police from the courthouse holding cells to the courtroom, he was taken up a flight of stairs into the path of a man, disguised as a barrister. The man shot Bennett several times in the chest. Bennett tried to flee but collapsed on the courthouse steps and died a short time later. Although Brian Kane was suspected, circumstantial evidence suggested a conspiracy to kill Bennett, which included senior members of the Victorian Police, most notably Brian Murphy with whom Bennett had a long-standing feud.

No one has ever been arrested for Bennett's murder, which was, in effect, an execution. The money was never recovered and although Norman Lee was charged, he was later acquitted. None of the other members of the gang was ever convicted. Prendergast disappeared in 1985, and apart from Lee, the rest of the gang had all been murdered by the end of 1987. In 1992, Lee was killed by police during a heist at Melbourne Airport. Lee's lawyer, Phillip Dunn, QC, later revealed the details of the crime, including the identities of all those involved. As no one was ever jailed or convicted, the Great Bookie robbery technically remains an unsolved crime.

In popular culture
Robbery is a 1985 Australian television film directed by Michael Thornhill based on the original crime but otherwise entirely fictional.

In 1986 a miniseries of three 90-minute episodes was released depicting the robbery. This miniseries started filming on 26 August 1984, and was broadcast in November 1986. Lee participated in the production as a consultant, and even used his own residence in Verity Street, Richmond as the shooting location for the house of one of the gang. Lee was still living there at the time of his death.

The 2002 Australian feature film The Hard Word draws on the Great Bookie robbery for its major crime scene. In this version, however, a number of people are killed during the robbery.

A highly fictionalised version of the crime was also depicted in one episode of the 2009 miniseries Underbelly: A Tale of Two Cities. In this version, Bennett pulls off the crime with the assistance of Robert Trimbole, without the Kane brothers. The Kanes are tipped off after the event by Chris Flannery, setting off a turf war. Neither Trimbole nor Flannery were actually involved in the real heist.

References

External links 
 Summary of crime including details revealed by Phillip Dunn, QC
 http://www.news.com.au/lifestyle/real-life/true-stories/defence-barrister-philip-dunn-on-australias-most-notorious-robbery/news-story/a1ba715989c6d68df7df14a918c00f35
 http://www.news.com.au/national/crime/inside-the-great-bookie-robbery/news-story/119b281434cd3eace556fcf8d3e98adf

Organised crime events in Australia
1976 crimes in Australia
Crime in Melbourne
Robberies in Australia
1970s in Melbourne
April 1976 events in Australia